Goodwin Farm Complex is a historic home and farm located near Bells, Chatham County, North Carolina.  The complex was established during the period 1850–1860. The main house consists of the original combined log cabin and detached kitchen in a one-story triple-A frame house, with a two-story section added about 1900.  Also on the property are late-19th century agricultural outbuildings.

It was listed on the National Register of Historic Places in 1985.

References

Houses on the National Register of Historic Places in North Carolina
Houses completed in 1900
Houses in Chatham County, North Carolina
National Register of Historic Places in Chatham County, North Carolina